Quah Kim Lye (born 1943) is a former Singapore national football team captain who played for National Football League side Tampines Rovers and the Singapore Lions in the Malaysia Cup as a striker.

Born to father Quah Heck Hock and mother Lau Ah Noi, Quah is a member of the noted footballing family which has produced fellow Singapore internationals such as brothers Kim Beng, Kim Swee, Kim Siak and Kim Song. Along with his brothers, he was discovered by famed national team coach Choo Seng Quee.

Quah underwent a heart bypass surgery in May 2012.

References

Living people
1943 births
Singaporean footballers
Singapore international footballers
Singapore FA players
Association football forwards
Singaporean sportspeople of Chinese descent